Louis-Charles-Auguste Hébert (31 December 1763 – 3 October 1836) was a missionary of Paris Foreign Missions Society and was the Vicar Apostolic of Madurai and Coromandel Coast from 8 July 1836 until his death on 3 October 1836.

Biography
He was born in Villedieu-lès-Bailleul, France on 31 December 1763. He left for the Malabar Mission on 29 January 1792 and arrived in Pondicherry the same year. He was given charge of the newly constituted College (seminary). At the same time he was asked to be in charge of the parishes of Oulgaret and Nellitope in Pondicherry.

In 1806 he was nominated Bishop of Halicarnasse (titular see) and coadjutor to Mgr. Champenois who, because of Hébert's poor health, refused to ordained him bishop. When after 5 years he consented to do so, it was Fr. Hébert who refused to be consecrated that nobody was available to replace him in his parishes as well as procurator of the mission.

After the death of Mgr. Champenois and Fr. Hebert had to go to Verapoly in a bullock-cart to be consecrated as bishop by carmelite Paolo Antonio Roviglia, titular bishop of Sura and Apostolic Vicar of Malabar, on 2 March 1811. Having left Pondicherry on 5 February on his bullock-cart, he was back on 4 April, covering almost 1000 km for his consecration. His episcopal motto was Euntes Prædicate, which means Go Preach, taken from Mark 16:15.

Because of the French Revolution and subsequently the Napoleonic wars, the Malabar mission was in a very critical situation. Priests and financial resources were scarce. Only after 1819 was it possible to send young missionaries and only 6 local priests were ordained between 1814 and 1823.

During the epidemic of cholera in 1829, the Bishop distributed as much help as he was able to. He even has to melt the sacred vessels and sell them to make some money to help the victims of the famine. Mgr. Hebert obtained from Rome the title of Vicar Apostolic but died on 3 October 1836 before the Brief reached him.

Under his administration, the Sisters of St. Joseph of Cluny came to Pondicherry to open an orphanage for girls. In 1828, he chose Father Clément Bonnand as his coadjutor and consecrated him on 1833.

References

 
 

 

 

1763 births
1836 deaths
Roman Catholic archbishops of Pondicherry and Cuddalore
19th-century Roman Catholic archbishops in India
Paris Foreign Missions Society missionaries
People from Orne
French Roman Catholic bishops in Asia
Roman Catholic missionaries in India
French expatriates in India